Rue du Petit-Champlain (English: Little Champlain Street) is a street in the Canadian city of Quebec City, Quebec. It is located in the Petit Champlain commercial district, at the foot of Cap Diamant, and contains many boutique shops. Quartier du Petit Champlain is claimed to be the oldest commercial district in North America. It is named for Samuel de Champlain, who founded Quebec City in 1608.

A popular viewing point of the street, the Breakneck Stairs (or Breakneck Steps), are located at the northern end of the street.

Just beyond the steps is the lower entrance of the Funiculaire du Vieux-Québec, an electric cableway established in 1879. It takes passengers up and down Cap Diamant to and from Dufferin Terrace, beside the Château Frontenac.

Around halfway along the street, on its western side, is Parc Félix-Leclerc.

The western side of the street contains frontages of buildings, in the shadow of Cap Diamant to their rears, whereas the rears of the buildings facing Boulevard Champlain occupy the eastern side.

A fresco painted on the side of the building at number 102 is a trompe-l'œil measuring 100m2 (900 ft2). It represents the history of the district, the bombardments of 1759, the landslides, and the fires which have occurred in the district.

Gallery

References

External links

Petit Champlain
Petit Champlain
1688 establishments in Canada
Petit Champlain